USCGC Polar Star (WAGB-10) is a United States Coast Guard heavy icebreaker. Commissioned in 1976, the ship was built by Lockheed Shipbuilding and Construction Company of Seattle, Washington along with sister ship, .

Homeported in Seattle, Polar Star operates under the control of Coast Guard Pacific Area and coordinates her operations through the Ice Operations Section of the United States Coast Guard. After Polar Sea was deactivated in 2010, Polar Star became the US's only heavy icebreaker. The Coast Guard's only other icebreaker, despite being classified as a "medium icebreaker", is actually larger than 'Polar Star' (13,623 LT versus 16,000 LT).

Replacement ships for what is called the Polar Security Cutter program have been ordered for a new generation of USCG icebreakers.

Design
In August 1971 the Secretary of Transportation announced awarding of a contract to Lockheed Shipbuilding and Construction Company of Seattle, Washington, "to build the world's most powerful icebreaker for the US Coast Guard," Polar Star, the first of two "Polar-Class" icebreakers.

The ship's three shafts are turned by either a diesel-electric or gas turbine prime mover. Each shaft is connected to a  diameter, four-bladed, controllable-pitch propeller.

Polar Star'''s shell plating and associated internal support structure are fabricated from steel that has especially good low-temperature strength. The curved bow allows Polar Star to ride up on the ice, using the ship's weight to break the ice.

Later upgrades allowed it to serve as a scientific research platform with five laboratories, additional space for seven portable laboratories on deck and accommodations for up to 35 scientists.

 Operational history 
In May and early June 1976 Polar Star conducted ice trials in the Arctic regions during Arctic West Summer (AWS76) operations. The starboard controllable pitch propeller failed, followed up shortly by the same type of failure on the port propeller. Removal of the wing propellers and opening of the hubs revealed massive failures of the links, link bearings, and drive pins. While the centerline propeller functioned satisfactorily, it too displayed evidence of incipient failure of the link bearings. Propeller issues continued through 1977-1988, leading Coast Guard to invoke the warranty clause of the Lockheed Shipbuilding and Construction Company.Polar Star has supported National Science Foundation and United States Antarctic Program objectives in the Antarctic, breaking a channel through the fast ice to resupply the McMurdo Station in the Ross Sea and the close quarter ice escorts of Military Sealift Command resupply ships through the channel in support of Operation Deep Freeze, which deliver food, fuel, and other goods to the station annually. Polar Star is the only ship in the United States' fleet capable of breaking the fast ice in McMurdo Sound. Polar Star also delivered inspectors from the U. S. Antarctic Inspection team to foreign outposts for the purpose of Antarctic Treaty Inspections.

Arctic deployments for occurred, including the annual resupply of Thule Air Base, Greenland, as well as science and power projection based operations referred to as Arctic East Summer (AES), Arctic West Summer (AWS), and Arctic West Winter (AWW).

In the 1997-1998 season, the ship supported the New Zealand Antarctic Research Programme. In February 1998 Polar Star received a report from the Greewave that they were disabled and adrift off Cape Adare. Arriving on scene the next day Polar Star took the Greewave in tow and proceeded on a 12-day 1515 mile transit to Lyttelton, New Zealand. This was the first visit by a military vessel of the United States to New Zealand in 13 years.

 Reserve status — Overhaul 
The ship was placed in reserve, or "Commission-Special" status, in 2006 and stationed in Seattle. A 26 February 2008 report by the Congressional Research Service estimated a US$400 million cost for a 25-year service life extension refit for Polar Star, a US$56 million cost for an 8 to 10-year service life extension refit or US$8.2 million cost for a single season service life extension refit. This caretaker status required a reduced crew of 44 to keep the ship ready for a possible return to the ice. In 2009, the NSF announced that they would end funding for maintaining the ship.

The ship was reactivated for overhaul, which took four years and was completed by Seattle's Vigor Industrial shipyard (formerly Todd Pacific shipyard), at a cost of US$57 million. Polar Star was back in operation in late 2013, and assigned to Antarctic operations as part of Operation Deep Freeze in early 2014 for the first time since 2006.

 Current Operations 
On Christmas day 2020, Polar Star reached 72 degrees 11 minutes north, the farthest north any US government surface vessel has reached in the winter. The Arctic West Winter mission included travel in heavy ice in total darkness and joint exercises with Russian aircraft at the US Russian maritime boundary in the Bering Sea. During the deployment Polar Star made port calls in Dutch Harbor Alaska and Juneau Alaska.

Over the course of its service life, Polar Star steamed in all five oceans, made calls in more than 60 ports across six continents; circumnavigated North America, South America, and Antarctica (likely the first such circumnavigation since 1843 as well as the first to do so completely poleward of 60o); rounded Cape Horn, transited the North West Passage, and circumnavigated Earth.  Operational highlights include assisting with waterside security during the 1984 Los Angeles Summer Olympics, completing the first solo breakout of McMurdo Sound (Operation Deep Freeze 1988), seven consecutive Operation Deep Freeze missions between 2014 and 2020, as well as reaching 72 degrees 11 minutes north (the farthest north any US government surface vessel reached in the winter).  Since her commissioning on January 17, 1976, Polar Star'''s 24 deployments in support of Operation Deep Freeze are second only to USCGC Glacier (WAGB-4) and her 29 Deep Freeze missions.

On 15 Dec 2021 the Vessel has been seen berthed in Wellington, New Zealand - likely in preparation for the southern summer season.

On 08 Aug 2022, the Vessel was seen moored at Pier 30 in San Francisco, CA.

References

 U.S. Department of Homeland Security. United States Coast Guard Historian's Office

Bibliography

External links

 Arctic Exploration Online

Polar-class icebreakers
1976 ships
Ships built by Lockheed Shipbuilding and Construction Company